Jung Jin-ho (born 10 March 1986) is a South Korean handball player. At the 2012 Summer Olympics he competed with the South Korea men's national handball team in the men's tournament, playing as a pivot. As of 2021, he was playing club handball with Incheon Metropolitan City Corporation.

References

Living people
1986 births
Handball players at the 2012 Summer Olympics
Olympic handball players of South Korea
South Korean male handball players